Tuncer is a Turkish surname and a masculine given name. Notable people with the name include:

Surname
 Buğrahan Tuncer (born 1993), Turkish professional basketball player 
 Cem Tuncer (born 1978), bass guitarist, composer, arranger, and producer
 Cengiz Tuncer (1942–1992), Turkish politician
 Erol Tuncer (born 1938), Turkish engineer, bureaucrat and politician
 Firat Tuncer (born 1995), Turkish football player
 Onur Tuncer (born 1984), Turkish football player
 M. Nurullah Tuncer (born 1959), Turkish theatre director
 Mustafa Tuncer (born 1971), Turkish politician
 Onur Tuncer (born 1984), Turkish football player
 Yenal Tuncer (born 1985), Turkish football player

Given name
 Tuncer Bakırhan (born 1970), Turkish Kurdish politician
 Tuncer Kayalar (born 1952), Turkish diplomat
 Tuncer Ören (born c. 1935), Turkish Canadian systems engineer and academic

Turkish-language surnames
Turkish masculine given names